Montgomery City is a city in and the county seat of Montgomery County, Missouri, United States. The population was 2,811 at the 2020 census.

History
Montgomery was platted in 1853, taking its name from Montgomery County. A post office called Montgomery City has been in operation since 1857.

The Sylvester Marion and Frances Anne Stephens Baker House was listed on the National Register of Historic Places in 1999.

Geography
Montgomery City is located at  (38.976812, -91.505026).

Demographics

2010 census
As of the census of 2010, there were 2,834 people, 1,141 households, and 711 families living in the city. The racial makeup of the city was 92.6% White, 3.6% African American, 0.2% Native American, 0.1% Asian, 1.9% from other races, and 1.5% from two or more races. Hispanic or Latino of any race were 2.6% of the population.

There were 1,141 households, of which 33.1% had children under the age of 18 living with them, 44.8% were married couples living together, 12.8% had a female householder with no husband present, 4.7% had a male householder with no wife present, and 37.7% were non-families. 32.5% of all households were made up of individuals, and 13.6% had someone living alone who was 65 years of age or older. The average household size was 2.36 and the average family size was 2.97.

The median age in the city was 35.3 years. 26.6% of residents were under the age of 18; 8.2% were between the ages of 18 and 24; 26.4% were from 25 to 44; 24.7% were from 45 to 64; and 14.3% were 65 years of age or older. The gender makeup of the city was 48.7% male and 51.3% female.

2000 census
As of the census of 2000, there were 2,442 people, 1,032 households, and 666 families living in the city. The population density was 858.6 people per square mile (332.0/km). There were 1,162 housing units at an average density of 408.5 per square mile (158.0/km). The racial makeup of the city was 94.19% White, 3.81% African American, 0.25% Native American, 0.16% Asian, 0.25% from other races, and 1.35% from two or more races. Hispanic or Latino of any race were 0.33% of the population.

There were 1,032 households, out of which 30.7% had children under the age of 18 living with them, 49.7% were married couples living together, 11.7% had a female householder with no husband present, and 35.4% were non-families. 31.3% of all households were made up of individuals, and 15.4% had someone living alone who was 65 years of age or older. The average household size was 2.29 and the average family size was 2.88.

In the city, the population was spread out, with 24.2% under the age of 18, 9.2% from 18 to 24, 27.4% from 25 to 44, 22.4% from 45 to 64, and 16.7% who were 65 years of age or older. The median age was 37 years. For every 100 females, there were 91.8 males. For every 100 females age 18 and over, there were 85.7 males.

The median income for a household in the city was $30,446, and the median income for a family was $38,063. Males had a median income of $28,906 versus $17,857 for females. The per capita income for the city was $15,735. About 10.9% of families and 14.0% of the population were below the poverty line, including 18.7% of those under age 18 and 12.8% of those age 65 or over.

Education
Public education in Montgomery City is administered by Montgomery County R-II School District.

Montgomery City has a lending library, the Montgomery City Public Library.

Notable people
Montgomery City was the hometown of Ray Moore, the creator of the comic strip "The Phantom".

Former mayor Jeff Porter was elected in 2018 to the Missouri House of Representatives from the 42nd district.

References

External links
 Historic maps of Montgomery City in the Sanborn Maps of Missouri Collection at the University of Missouri
Local Government Website: http://www.montgomerycitymo.org/
School District: http://mc-wildcats.org
Montgomery County R-II High School Alumni:  https://web.archive.org/web/20110714184127/http://mc-wildcats-alum.ning.com/

Cities in Montgomery County, Missouri
County seats in Missouri
Cities in Missouri